Gizem Yavuz (born 10 March 1988) is a Turkish female basketball player. The  national plays Point guard.

Career
On 20 May 2021, she signed a one-year contract with Galatasaray.

References

External links
 Gizem Yavuz at Tbf.org

1988 births
Living people
Galatasaray S.K. (women's basketball) players
Turkish women's basketball players
TED Ankara Kolejliler players
Emlak Konut SK players
Çankaya Üniversitesi SK players